The 1976 Formula 750 season was the fourth season of the FIM Formula 750 Prize. The confused results of the Venezuelan round caused the championship's final standings to be shrouded in controversy. Kawasaki's Gary Nixon appeared to have won the second leg of the Venezuelan race however, the race organizers credited Yamaha's Steve Baker with the victory. Víctor Palomo was crowned champion, winning three races on aggregate despite not winning a single heat. If Nixon had been awarded the victory in the Venezuelan round, he would have won the world championship by one point. Nixon protested the Venezuelan results to the FIM, who threw out the results of the event, thus denying his appeal.

Calendar

Notes:
1. - The Daytona 200 was run as a single race rather than the aggregate of two heats that the other races used.
2. – The Venezuela 200 Miles was given non-championship status following a timekeeping error.

Championship standings

References

See also
 1976 Grand Prix motorcycle racing season

Books
 

Formula 750
Formula 750